The 2011 Spokane mayoral election took place on November 8, 2011, to elect the mayor of Spokane, Washington. It saw David Condon unseat incumbent mayor Mary Verner.

Results

Primary
Washington has a nonpartisan blanket primary system. The top two-finishers in the primary face each other in the general election.

The primary was held on August 16, 2011.

General election

References

2011
Spokane
Spokane